The 26th Actors and Actresses Union Awards ceremony was held on 13 March 2017 at the Circo Price in Madrid. The gala was hosted by Cristina Medina.

In addition to the competitive awards, Jaime Lorente Acosta received the '' award, Alicia Hermida the '' career award and  the Special Award. Inma Cuevas won two awards, both in television and theatre categories.

Winners and nominees 
The winners and nominees are listed as follows:

Film

Television

Theatre

Newcomers

References 

Actors and Actresses Union Awards
2017 in Madrid
2017 television awards
2017 film awards
2017 theatre awards
March 2017 events in Spain